Robert Crosby may refer to:

 Robert B. Crosby (1911–2000), governor of Nebraska
 Robert A. Crosby (1896–1947), rodeo competitor
 Rob Crosby (born 1954), American country music artist
 Bob Crosby (1913–1993), American jazz singer and bandleader
 Bobby Crosby (born 1980), American baseball player